Zibi may refer to:

 Kitigan Zibi, an Algonquin First Nations reserve in Quebec, Canada. 
 Zibi, a mixed-use land redevelopment project in Ottawa, Ontario, Canada.
 Zbigniew Boniek, a Polish former footballer and manager.